Jazmin Chaudhary (better known as Jazmin) is a Bangladesh-born American adult film actress. She is the first pornographic actor known to have been born in Bangladesh. Born on May 15, 1985 in Chattogram, Bangladesh, she moved the United States with her parents at an young age. There, at the age of 19, she came into pornographic acting. In her five years career between 2004 and 2008, she featured in over 90 films, and worked for Spiegler Girls (one of the most influential agencies in the adult film industry). At the 2005 AVN Awards Show (the top award in adult industry), Jazmin (credited as Jasmine) won the award of Best Group Sex Scene, Video for Orgy World: The Next Level 7 by Evasive Angles. Bangladesh Booty, the first Bangladesh-themed pornographic film was made with Jazmin in the lead. She retired from the adult industry in 2008 with a husband and a son.

References

External links

 
 
 
 Profile in AVN.com

1985 births
American pornographic film actresses
Living people
Bangladeshi pornographic film actresses
21st-century American women